Kasatonov is a surname. Notable people with the surname include:

 Alexei Kasatonov (b. 1959), Russian ice hockey player
 Vladimir Kasatonov (1910-1989), Soviet military leader
 Vladimir Lvovich Kasatonov (b. 1962), Russian naval officer

Russian-language surnames